Armand A. Dufresne Jr. (January 17, 1909 – April 1994), of Lewiston, Maine, was a justice of the Maine Supreme Judicial Court from August 25, 1965, until his retirement on September 16, 1977. Dufresne was "educated at the Seminary of St. Charles-Borromee in Sherbrooke, Quebec, and at the Montreal Seminary of Philosophy, and received a law degree from the Boston College Law School in 1935.

References

Justices of the Maine Supreme Judicial Court
Boston College Law School alumni
People from Lewiston, Maine
1909 births
1994 deaths